Kenduri or selametan or kenduren (Jawa call for kenduri) is a Javanese ritual. Kenduri is a banquet for remembering something, requesting blessing, and other religious ceremonies. 

Kenduri is usually a gathering of a community and is led by the oldest person or someone who has a religion knowledge. The gathering is usually solely for the male population. For women, this banquet give them a chance to socialise while they prepare a meal for the Kenduri.

References

Javanese culture
Islamic culture
Religious food and drink